Feredune Dittia (1919 – 16 February 1985) was an Indian cricketer. He played first-class cricket for Hyderabad and Services between 1940 and 1951.

See also
 List of Hyderabad cricketers

References

External links
 

1919 births
1985 deaths
Indian cricketers
Hyderabad cricketers
Services cricketers
Place of birth missing